Malagoniella astyanax is a species of (formerly canthonini) in the beetle family Scarabaeidae. It is found in South America.

Subspecies
These five subspecies belong to the species Malagoniella astyanax:
 Malagoniella astyanax astyanax (Olivier, 1789)
 Malagoniella astyanax columbica (Harold, 1867)
 Malagoniella astyanax polita (Halffter, Pereira & Martinez, 1960)
 Malagoniella astyanax punctatostriata (Blanchard, 1846)
 Malagoniella astyanax yucateca (Harold, 1863)

References

Further reading

 

Deltochilini
Articles created by Qbugbot
Beetles described in 1789